Terence Farrell (1798 – 19 March 1876) was an Irish sculptor, now best known for his portrait busts and works at Wrest Park for Earl de Grey.

Farrell was born in Creve, County Longford, and in 1810 brought to Dublin and enrolled in the Modelling School of the Dublin Society, where he studied under Edward Smyth and later John Smyth. After school, he entered Thomas Kirk's studio, where he continued his studies for nearly seven years as a pupil, and subsequently as an assistant. In 1826 he made his first contribution to the Royal Hibernian Academy, and about 1828 he established his own workshop. He  exhibited regularly in the Academy, where he was elected an Associate in July, 1851, and a Member in May, 1859. He is buried in St Andrew's Church, Westland Row, Dublin.

Selected works 
 Sir Lowry Cole. Statue in Portland stone, Enniskillen.
 William, 3rd Earl of Enniskillen. Statue, Enniskillen Church.
 Lt.-Col. Tomlinson. Monument erected by the officers of the 18th Royal Irish Regiment, St. Patrick's Cathedral, 1853.
 Sir Hussey Vivian, Commander of the Forces. Monument, Truro Church, Cornwall.
 Early Affliction. Marble Statue. R.H.A., 1848.
 The Seasons, Wrest Park.

References 
 A Dictionary of Irish Artists, 1913.
 A Biographical Dictionary of Sculptors in Britain, 1660-1851, 2009, pp. 420-1.
 'Terence Farrell ARHA, RHA', Mapping the Practice and Profession of Sculpture in Britain and Ireland 1851-1951, University of Glasgow
 Library Ireland entry
 Oxford Index entry

1798 births
1876 deaths
19th-century Irish sculptors
19th-century male artists
Male sculptors
People from County Longford
Members of the Royal Hibernian Academy